EVGA may refer to:
 Extended Video Graphics Array, a VESA standard for 1024x768 resolution
 EVGA Corporation, an American computer hardware company
 Evga S.A, a Greek dairy company